John Schneiter (1899 – 15 September 1976) was a Swiss bobsledder who competed in the late 1920s and early 1930s. At the 1928 Winter Olympics he was a member of the Swiss team Suisse II which finished 13th in the five man competition. He won a silver medal in the four-man event at the first FIBT World Championships in Montreux, Switzerland, at the Caux-sur-Montreux hotel in 1930.

References

profile
Bobsleigh four-man world championship medalists since 1930

1899 births
1976 deaths
Swiss male bobsledders
Olympic bobsledders of Switzerland
Bobsledders at the 1928 Winter Olympics
20th-century Swiss people